Lubudi River may refer to the following rivers in the Democratic Republic of the Congo (DRC):

 Lubudi River (Lualaba tributary)
 Lubudi River (Sankuru tributary)